Babaali or Baba Ali may refer to:

Baba Ali, Hamadan
Baba Ali, Kermanshah
Babaali, Lorestan